Mount Pleasant is a residential neighbourhood in the northwest quadrant of Calgary, Alberta. It is located immediately north from the Trans-Canada Highway and the community of Rosedale. To the north and west it is bounded by the Confederation Park.

It is represented in the Calgary City Council by the Ward 7 councillor.

Demographics

Residents in this community had a median household income of $48,334 in 2000, and there were 15.3% low income residents living in the neighbourhood. As of 2000, 14.4% of the residents were immigrants. A proportion of 24.7% of the buildings were condominiums or apartments, and 40.4% of the housing was used for renting.

See also
List of neighbourhoods in Calgary

References

External links
Mount Pleasant Community Association

Neighbourhoods in Calgary